Alan Murray may refer to:
 Alan Murray (footballer) (born 1949), English football manager
 Alan Robert Murray (1954/55–2021), sound editor
 Alan Murray (golfer) (born 1940), Australian golfer

See also
 Allan Murray (born 1982), Australian rules footballer
 Allan Murray (swimmer) (born 1972), retired Bahamian swimmer